Ab initio is a Latin term used in English, meaning from the beginning.

Ab initio may also refer to:

 Ab Initio (company), an ETL Tool Software Company in the field of Data Warehousing.
 Ab initio quantum chemistry methods
 Marriages annulled under the Catholic Church are considered as annulled  ab initio, meaning that the marriage was invalid from the beginning